Haw Branch is a stream in Butler County in the U.S. state of Missouri. It is a tributary of Cane Creek.

Haw Branch was named for the black haw in the area.

See also
List of rivers of Missouri

References

Rivers of Butler County, Missouri
Rivers of Missouri